Lawrence Holmes (born 10 January 1962 in Georgetown, British Guiana) is a Canadian former wrestler who competed in the 1984 Summer Olympics and in the 1988 Summer Olympics. He is the brother of Gary Holmes.

References

External links
 

1962 births
Living people
Sportspeople from Georgetown, Guyana
Guyanese emigrants to Canada
Olympic wrestlers of Canada
Wrestlers at the 1984 Summer Olympics
Wrestlers at the 1988 Summer Olympics
Black Canadian sportspeople
Canadian male sport wrestlers